Tuckbox may refer to:
Lunch box, also a private stash of food for boys at boarding school 
Tuck Box Nick Drake compilation album
The Tuck Box Fairy Tail cottage by Hugh W. Comstock